Kepler-18 is a star with almost the same mass as the Sun in the Cygnus constellation

Planetary system
The star is orbited by 3 confirmed planets, announced in 2011. In 2021, it was found the orbital plane of Kepler-18d is slowly changing, likely under the gravitational influence of the additional giant planet.

References

External links
Kepler-18, The Open Exoplanet Catalogue
Kepler 18, Exoplanet.eu

Cygnus (constellation)
137
Planetary transit variables
Planetary systems with three confirmed planets
J19521906+4444467
G-type stars